Wild Ride was the second album released by Steve Forde and the Flange it was a follow-up to Livin Right and had 3 singles.

Track listing

The Old Days
Drinking Things Over
Another Man
That's My Life
You & Me
The Letter
Upstream
Head Over Heels
Beer & Women
Catch Me If You Can
That Too

Singles
Another Man
Beer & Women
The Letter

References

Steve Forde albums